A War of Gifts: An Ender Story is a 2007 science fiction novella by American writer Orson Scott Card.  This book is set in Card's Ender's Game series and takes place during Ender Wiggin's time at Battle School as described in Card's novels Ender's Game and Ender's Shadow.

Characters

Morgan family
Zeck Morgan – the anti-hero protagonist. 
Reverend Habit Morgan – Zeck's father
Unnamed – Zeck's mother
Unnamed – Zeck's three younger siblings

Wiggin family
Ender Wiggin
Peter Wiggin – Ender's older brother
Valentine Wiggin – Ender's older sister
John Paul Wiggin – Ender's father
Theresa Wiggin – Ender's mother

Students
Dink Meeker – Dutch boy
"Rose de Nose" Rosen
Filippus "Flip" Rietveld – Dutch boy
Bonzo Madrid
Ahmed – Pakistani (Muslim) student

International Fleet personnel
Captain Brridegan
Agnes O'Toole – IF tester
Colonel Graff – Battle School commander

Literary significance and reception
A War of Gifts was not particularly well received by genre critics.  The chief complaint with the story is that although it raises the issues of faith, religious freedom and religious suppression, it does so in a very superficial manner.  Some critics have also commented on the character of Ender Wiggin who is described as being too Christ-like to be believable. A Publishers Weekly review described it as "an amusing and sincere tale".

Connection to other parts of the Ender series
In addition to being set during Ender's Game and Ender's Shadow, the Islamic counter reaction to the Christmas celebrations in A War of Gifts sows the seeds for the creation of the Muslim Caliphate by Battle School graduates which plays a major role in the Shadow series.

See also

Ender's Game (series)
List of Ender's Game characters
List of works by Orson Scott Card

References

External links

 Publication information for A War of Gifts available from Card's website
 

2007 American novels
American science fiction novels
Novels set in North Carolina
Ender's Game series books
Tor Books books